The Texas All-Star USA Tag Team Championship was a major tag team title in Texas All-Star Wrestling. The title was first established in Southwest Championship Wrestling in 1981 when it was the SCW Southwest Tag Team Championship. The title's name was changed to the Texas All-Star Texas Tag Team Championship in May 1985 after SCW was sold to Texas All-Star Wrestling in April, and changed again to the Texas All-Star USA Tag Team Championship in 1986 before the title was abandoned in November that year when Texas All-Star was purchased by the World Class Wrestling Association.

Title history

References

External links
SWCW Southwest Tag Team title history

Southwest Championship Wrestling championships
Tag team wrestling championships
State professional wrestling championships